The 2019–20 New Mexico State Aggies men's basketball team represented New Mexico State University during the 2019–20 NCAA Division I men's basketball season. The Aggies were led by third-year head Chris Jans, and played their home games at the Pan American Center in Las Cruces, New Mexico as members of the Western Athletic Conference. They finished the season 25–6, 16–0 in WAC play to win the WAC regular season championship. They were set to be the No. 1 seed in the WAC tournament, however, the tournament was cancelled amid the COVID-19 pandemic. Due to the WAC Tournament cancellation, they were awarded the WAC's automatic bid to the NCAA tournament. However, the NCAA Tournament was also cancelled due to the same outbreak.

Previous season 
The Aggies finished the 2018–19 season 30–5, 15–1 in WAC play to win the WAC regular season championship. They defeated Chicago State, Texas-Rio Grande Valley, and Grand Canyon to win the WAC tournament. As a result, they received the WAC's automatic bid to the NCAA tournament where they lost in the first round to Auburn.

Roster

Schedule and results
Source:

|-
!colspan=9 style=| Non-conference regular season

|-
!colspan=9 style=| WAC Regular Season

|-
!colspan=9 style=| WAC tournament
|- style="background:#bbbbbb"
| style="text-align:center"|Mar 12, 20201:00 pm, ESPN+
| style="text-align:center"| (1)
| vs. (8) Chicago StateQuarterfinals
| colspan=5 rowspan=1 style="text-align:center"|Cancelled due to the COVID-19 pandemic
| style="text-align:center"|Orleans ArenaParadise, NV
|-

References

New Mexico State Aggies men's basketball seasons
New Mexico State
New Mexico State Aggies men's basketball
New Mexico State Aggies men's basketball